Qarloq castle is a historical castle located in Bojnord County in North Khorasan Province. The longevity of this fortress dates back to the Middle Ages Historical periods after Islam.

References 

Castles in Iran